Coleophora kaiynella is a moth of the family Coleophoridae. It is found in Kyrgyzstan.

The larvae feed on Betula species, including Betula tianshanica. They feed on the leaves of their host plant.

Subspecies
Coleophora kaiynella kaiynella
Coleophora kaiynella talasensis (Falkovitsh, 1991)

References

kaiynella
Moths described in 1991
Moths of Asia